Heal is the fourth extended play (EP) by South Korean girl group Lovelyz. The album was released on April 23, 2018 by Woollim Entertainment and distributed by Kakao M. The album contains six tracks, including the lead single "That Day".

Background and release
On April 6, Woollim Entertainment announced that Lovelyz would make a comeback on April 23. Promotion for the album began with the release of individual teasers of members through the group's official accounts on Twitter and Facebook from April 10 to April 13, with the group teasers being released on April 17. Through these teasers, the name of the album was unveiled, titled Heal. The lead single "That Day" was revealed with the release of the album's tracklist on April 19. The next day, Lovelyz released a longer version of the music video teaser for "That Day", and teased some parts of the chorus. Their EP officially released online and physically on April 23.

Promotions
Lovelyz held their comeback showcase at Blue Square iMarket Hall on April 23, 2018, the same day as the album's release, and was hosted by comedian Park Sung-kwang. It was broadcast live through the Naver app V-Live. During the showcase, they discussed their new songs, including the lead single "That Day", which they performed live for the first time. Lovelyz began their music show promotions, with their first comeback stage on Mnet's M Countdown where they performed "That Day" and "Watercolor" on April 26. They earned their first music show win for "That Day" on SBS MTV's The Show on May 1.

Composition
"That Day (그날의 너)" was written and composed by Sweetune, who previously produced "Emotion" and "The" in the second studio album R U Ready?. The song is described as "having a melodious and energetic melody reminiscent of "Ah-Choo", with the members' voices blended together to fit the season perfectly". The composers of the lead single "Twinkle" of the previous EP Fall in Lovelyz, 1Take and TAK, returned with a new b-side track titled "Shining★Star".

Commercial performance
Heal topped the iTunes K-pop Music Albums in the United States and Hong Kong in the first week of its release.

Track listing

Charts

Release history

References

2018 EPs
Lovelyz albums
Woollim Entertainment EPs
Korean-language EPs